The Derbyshire Portway is a pre-historic trackway that runs for over 40 miles across the Peak District of England.

History
The well-known section of the trackway runs from Mam Tor in north Derbyshire through the Peak District via Wirksworth to the Hemlock Stone near Nottingham and is said to have existed since the Bronze Age before falling out of regular use in the Middle Ages. However, there is evidence to suggest that the trackway originally extended to Manchester at the northern end and to Nottingham in the midlands.

The trackway takes in several historic locations, amongst others:

Mam Tor
Robin Hood's Stride
Nine Stones Close
Alport Height
Dale Abbey
Hemlock Stone

The Portway was the subject of a 2017 episode of the Channel 4 programme Britain's Ancient Tracks with Tony Robinson.

References

Ancient trackways in England
Bronze Age England
Peak District